The Shemakha uezd was a county (uezd) within the Baku Governorate of the Russian Empire, and then of Azerbaijan Democratic Republic and Azerbaijan SSR until its formal abolishment in 1929. The county was located in central part of the Baku Governorate, bordering the Javad uezd to the south, Baku uezd to the east, Geokchay uezd to the west and Kuba uezd to the north. The administrative centre of the county was the city of Shemakha (present-day Shamakhi).

Administrative divisions 
The subcounties (uchastoks) of the Shemakha uezd in 1912 were as follows:

History
The county was established in 1840 and was initially made part of the Caspian Oblast, and later became the capital of the Shemakha Governorate in 1846. But due to an earthquake in 1859, the city and most of the county suffered great damage. Subsequently, capital of the Shemakha Governorate was moved from Shemakha to Baku and the governorate was renamed Baku Governorate.

Demographics

Russian Empire Census 
The majority of the population indicated Tatar to be their mother tongue, with significant Armenian, Russian, and Tat speaking minorities.

Kavkazskiy kalendar 

Soviet census (1926) 
In 1926, the population of the county declined to 91,185.

See also
 Shirvan Khanate

Notes

References

Bibliography 

Geographic history of Azerbaijan
States and territories established in 1840
1840 establishments in the Russian Empire
1929 disestablishments in the Soviet Union
Uezds of Baku Governorate
Uezds of the Soviet Union
States and territories disestablished in 1929